Bob and Mike Bryan were the defending champions and successfully defended their title, defeating Luke Bambridge and Ben McLachlan in the final, 3–6, 7–5, [10–5].

Seeds

Draw

Draw

References

External Links
 Main draw

Delray Beach Open - Doubles
2020 Doubles
Delray Beach Open – Doubles
Delray Beach Open – Doubles